Shannon Stubbs MP (born December 8, 1979) is a Canadian politician who was elected to represent the riding of Lakeland in the House of Commons of Canada in the 2015 federal election. She was re-elected to represent the same riding in the 2019 and 2021 federal elections.

Background 
Shannon Stubbs was born near Chipman, Alberta in 1979. She is part Ojibwa and is the daughter of Bruce Stubbs. She is the granddaughter of Eileen Stubbs, a former mayor of Dartmouth. Her mother died when she was 14. Of her grandmother, Stubbs has stated that “...She wasn’t partisan; she was all over the political map, but right and wrong mattered to her. I try to remember that and hope it will guide me in politics.”

Stubbs went to Lamont High School and holds a Bachelor of Arts (Joint Honours) in English and Political Science from the University of Alberta. During her university years, she served as an intern in Leader of the Opposition Preston Manning's office, and as an assistant to MP Deborah Grey. Stubbs is married to former Lac La Biche-St. Paul-Two Hills MLA Shayne Saskiw.

Political career

Provincial politics 
While working as a bureaucrat for the provincial government, Stubbs ran in the 2004 Alberta election for the governing Progressive Conservatives against Raj Pannu in Edmonton-Strathcona, placing a distant second. She later left the party and became involved with the Wildrose Party, serving as Danielle Smith's chief of staff from 2010–12 and the party's Director of Legislative Affairs from 2012–14.

In 2011, Stubbs won the Wildrose nomination in the riding of Fort Saskatchewan-Vegreville, held by premier Ed Stelmach, with hopes of overturning him in the 2012 Alberta election. He subsequently resigned and retired from politics, but Stubbs was defeated by PC candidate and former Strathcona County councillor Jacquie Fenske.

Federal politics 
Stubbs was elected in the 2015 federal election to represent the Conservative Party in the newly recreated riding of Lakeland with a 74% popular vote. She was appointed to the position of deputy critic for natural resources by Conservative interim leader Rona Ambrose. Here, she serves on the House's Standing Committee on Natural Resources. She also serves as vice-chair for the Special Committee on Pay Equity.

Shortly after Stubbs was elected in 2015, the federal government announced the relocation of an Immigration, Refugees, and Citizenship Canada case-processing centre in Vegreville, Alberta to be moved to Edmonton for better access. Being a subject of controversy, the centre officially closed in September 2018. Stubbs, however, won a 2017 Maclean's Parliamentarian of the Year award for MP that best represents constituents for her efforts to keep this centre open.

During her first term, Stubbs participated in 497 Chamber Interventions, 338 Committee Interventions, and 892 Chamber Votes. She seconded Bill C-406 which was an Act to amend the Canada Elections Act (foreign contributions). This Bill, however, did not become a law. In September, 2016, Stubbs presented petition e-216 to the House of Commons.

In May 2018, Stubbs sponsored motion M-167, the instruction to the Standing Committee on Public Safety and National Security to undergo a study on rural crime in Canada. This motion was jointly seconded by 17 members and was agreed to on May 20, 2018.

Stubbs was in full support when Conservative leader Andrew Scheer ran for leadership in the 2017 Conservative Party leadership election.

Stubbs was re-elected with 83.9% of the votes for her riding during the 2019 federal election, making Canadian history for receiving the highest percentage for a female candidate. During the ensuing 43rd Canadian Parliament, she introduced one private member bill, Bill C-221, An Act to amend the Income Tax Act (oil and gas wells) which sought to create a tax credit for corporate expenses incurred during the decommissioning of old and inactive oil and gas wells. It was brought to a vote on March 10, 2021, but defeated with only the Conservatives and Green Party members voting in favour.

After Erin O'Toole became the Conservative Party leader, he re-assigned Stubbs, effective September 8, 2020, to be the Official Opposition Shadow Minister for Public Safety and Emergency Preparedness.

In 2021 Stubbs again received a Maclean's Parliamentarian of the Year award for Member of Parliament that "Best Represents Constituents."

In early December 2021, O'Toole referred Stubbs for investigation by the House of Commons for allegedly creating a toxic workplace environment in her office. The Globe and Mail and The Canadian Press independently confirmed an incident in where some of Stubbs's employees felt pressured into painting a room in her house. Stubbs told The Globe that the housepainting was a gift and that the referral was reprisal by O'Toole over her criticism of her leadership.

Roles in Parliament

Election Candidate

Member of Parliament

Political Affiliation

Committees

Parliamentary Associations and Inter-Parliamentary Groups

Electoral record

Federal

Provincial

References

External links

Women members of the House of Commons of Canada
Conservative Party of Canada MPs
Living people
Members of the House of Commons of Canada from Alberta
People from Two Hills, Alberta
Women in Alberta politics
21st-century Canadian politicians
1979 births
21st-century Canadian women politicians